Gatundu North Constituency is an electoral constituency in Kenya. It is one of twelve constituencies in Kiambu County, one of four in the former Thika District. The constituency has four wards, all of them are within Thika County council. The constituency was established for the 1997 elections. Previously it was part of the larger Gatundu Constituency.

Members of Parliament

Economy of Gatundu North 
Gatundu North Constituency comprises four Markets; Kamwangi, Gatukuyu, Kairi and Makwa.
Kamwangi market and Gatukuyu market have dominated the rest of the Markets since Independence due to skewed distribution of resources and poor Infrastructure.  Kairi Market and Makwa market remain dormant.
The main economic activity is agriculture, poultry farming and livestock. World Bank's FAO, National Agriculture and Rural Inclusive Growth Project NARIGP have shown willingness and commitment to support Banana farming which is the main lifeline of the majority of constituents. Most of these farmers are poorly funded.
Coffee sector in this area has also deteriorated in years to unsustainable levels.

Karimenu 2 Dam 
Karimenu 2 Dam is located 50 km west of Thika town, upon completion by year 2020 the dam is expected to serve Areas of ruiru and juja with water for Irrigation and domestic use.

NARIGP (National Agricultural and Rural Inclusive Growth Project 
Gatundu North constituency was shortlisted as one of the beneficiaries  of ksh 22.6 billion NARIGP World Bank Project.

Health Care 
Gatundu North has one Level 4 Hospital.

References 

Populated places in Central Province (Kenya)
Constituencies in Kiambu County
Constituencies in Central Province (Kenya)
1997 establishments in Kenya
Constituencies established in 1997